Iron is a chemical element with symbol Fe and atomic number 26.

Iron may also refer to:

Equipment
 Iron (golf), a type of golf club
 Iron (plane), a woodworking blade
 Iron (theatre), a fire safety device
 Branding iron
 Clothes iron
 Hair iron
 Soldering iron
 Tire iron
 Waffle iron

Languages
 Iron Ossetian, spoken in the Caucasus
 Ivernic language, a hypothetical ancient language of Ireland

Music
 Iron (Ensiferum album)
 Iron (Silent Stream of Godless Elegy album)
 "Iron" (Nicky Romero and Calvin Harris song)
 "Iron" (Within Temptation song)
 "Iron" (Woodkid song), released as a single and a remix EP

Places
 Iron, Aisne, a commune in France
 Iron County (disambiguation), several US counties
 Iron Mountain (disambiguation)
 Iron River (Iron County, Michigan)
 Iron River (Marquette County, Michigan)
 Iron Township (disambiguation)
 Iron Cove, Sydney, New South Wales, Australia

Other uses
 Iron (people), a subgroup of the Ossetians
 Al-Hadid ("Iron" or "The Iron"), the fifty-seventh sura of the Qur'an
 Iron (metaphor)
 A short name for iron meteorite
 SRWare Iron, a freeware web browser
 The Iron, a nickname for Scunthorpe United F.C.
 Cast iron, a group of iron-carbon alloys
 Wrought iron, an iron alloy with a very low carbon
 Pig iron, an iron alloy with high carbon content
 Slang, can refer to a firearm
 Iron, a member of the DC Comics superhero group, the Metal Men.
 Iron (rapper) (1992–2021), stage name of South Korean rapper Jung Hun-cheol.

See also

 Ironing (disambiguation)
 Irons (disambiguation)
 Irone, a group of fragrant liquids, used in perfumes
 Fe (disambiguation)
 Isotopes of iron